Khun Nan National Park is a protected area in the western side of the Luang Prabang Range in the Thai/Lao border area, on the Thai side of the ridge. It is named after Khun Nan subdistrict (tambon) of Chaloem Phra Kiat District of Nan Province and includes parts located in Bo Kluea District. The park is located north of the Doi Phu Kha National Park and was established in 2009 with an area of 153,982 rai ~ .

Khun Nan National Park is part of the Luang Prabang montane rain forests ecoregion. Sapan Waterfall, located near the Lao border, is the most important waterfall in the park; Huai Ha waterfall has water throughout the year. Other waterfalls within the perimeter of the park are Huai Ti and Ban Den. 1,745 m high Doi Phi Pan Nam is the tallest peak within the park. The Wa River has its sources in the mountains of the park and flows through it.

See also
Thai highlands
 List of national parks of Thailand
 List of Protected Areas Regional Offices of Thailand

References

External links

Bangkok Post - Khun Nan National Park
Khun Nan National Park, Royal Forest Department

National parks of Thailand
Protected areas established in 2009
Tourist attractions in Nan province
2009 establishments in Thailand
Luang Prabang Range